Kang Young-sik (born June 17, 1981) is a South Korean professional baseball pitcher currently playing for the Lotte Giants of the KBO League.

References

External links
Career statistics and player information from Korea Baseball Organization

Kang Young-sik at Lotte Giants Baseball Club

1981 births
Haitai Tigers players
KBO League pitchers
Living people
Lotte Giants players
Samsung Lions players
South Korean baseball players
Sportspeople from Daegu
South Korean Buddhists
South Korean expatriate baseball players in the Dominican Republic
Leones del Escogido players